Artemisia globularia, the purple wormwood, is a rare Asian and North American species of plants in the sunflower family. It is native to Alaska, Yukon Territory, and the Chukotka Autonomous Okrug of Russia.

Artemisia globularia is a small, clumping perennial up to 30 cm (12 inches) tall. It is slightly aromatic and has many small, yellow flower heads. It grows in arctic and alpine tundra.

References

globularia
Flora of Alaska
Flora of Yukon
Flora of the Russian Far East
Plants described in 1834
Taxa named by Edward Lee Greene
Flora without expected TNC conservation status